Rui Daniel Morais Gomes (born 27 March 1987) is a Portuguese professional footballer who plays for Dragões Sandinenses as an attacking midfielder.

External links

1987 births
Sportspeople from Vila Nova de Gaia
Living people
Portuguese footballers
Association football midfielders
Liga Portugal 2 players
Segunda Divisão players
Boavista F.C. players
S.C. Dragões Sandinenses players
S.C. Espinho players
F.C. Arouca players
C.D. Trofense players
S.C. Praiense players
Gondomar S.C. players
Portugal youth international footballers